Rachel Wood may refer to:

Rachel Wood (archaeologist)
Rachel Wood (geologist), British geologist
Rachel Wood (soccer) (born 1990), American soccer player
Evan Rachel Wood, American actress, model and musician